Enrico Rossi Chauvenet (born 4 June 1984) is an Italian footballer who plays as a goalkeeper.

Club career

Youth career
Rossi Chauvenet started his career at hometown club Padova. He also spent 2 seasons at Internazionale's Primavera U20 Youth Team where he won the league champion, along with Mathieu Moreau as Alex Cordaz's backup. In 2002-03 season, Rossi remained at Primavera team and occasionally played for first team in club friendlies. That season Rossi competed with Moreau and Nathan Coe as first choice, which Rossi played both legs of Campionato Primavera round of 16, while Coe played in quarter-final, semi-final and final, which Inter lost to Lecce. While Moreau played at 2003 Torneo di Viareggio. After the season, Rossi Chauvenet returned to Padova and in 2004–05 season as Roberto Colombo's backup.

Lega Pro career
In 2005-06, Rossi Chauvenet left for Serie C2 side S.S.C. Venezia, which newly re-found to replace bankrupted AC Venezia. He was the backup of Massimo Lotti along with Tiziano Ramon. In the mid-season, he left for Serie B side Verona on loan, as Gianluca Pegolo's backup, along with Jess Vanstrattan. In the 2006-07 season, he returned to Venice, as Giuseppe Aprea's backup along with Lotti and in mid-season exchanged with Stefano Layeni of Serie C2 side Torres, where he played as Simone Deliperi's backup.

In the 2007-08 season, he left for Mezzocorona where he finally played as first choice, ahead Massimo Macchi, the first choice of last season. In 2008-09 season, he played for Prima Divisione side Monza, ahead Giacomo Bindi and Matteo Apuzzo as first choice. Since the signing of ex-Dutch internationals Sander Westerveld, Rossi Chauvenet became backup again. In January 2010, he left for fellow third division club Pergocrema, ahead young keeper Simone Colombi as first choice since February.

International career
Rossi Chauvenet received his only call-up for Italy U19 in September 2002, as Andrea Ivaldi's backup. The match team-mate Alessandro Potenza also played. He also call-up to Serie C U20 selection for 2004–05 Mirop Cup along with Luca Rossettini.

In 2005, he was called to Italy U21 B team specially for 2005 Mediterranean Games and for a preparation match against Serie D Best XI before the tournament. He played his only match with the team against Libya.

References

External links
 Profile at AIC.Football.it 
 

Italian footballers
Serie C players
Calcio Padova players
Inter Milan players
Venezia F.C. players
Hellas Verona F.C. players
A.C. Monza players
U.S. Pergolettese 1932 players
Association football goalkeepers
Sportspeople from Padua
1984 births
Living people
Competitors at the 2005 Mediterranean Games
Mediterranean Games competitors for Italy
Footballers from Veneto